William Lebghil (born 9 July 1990) is a French actor.

Filmography

Theater

References

External links
 

1990 births
Living people
French male film actors
French male television actors
21st-century French male actors